Niokosso is a town in northwest Ivory Coast. It is a sub-prefecture of Koro Department in Bafing Region, Woroba District. Five kilometres southwest of town is a border crossing with Guinea.

Niokosso was a commune until March 2012, when it became one of 1126 communes nationwide that were abolished.

Notes

Sub-prefectures of Bafing Region
Guinea–Ivory Coast border crossings
Former communes of Ivory Coast